The Mart-Life Detox Clinic is Nigeria's first Modern Myar Medical spa. The clinic is an Anti-aging Spa and Wellness center and also the first of its kind in Africa. Medical Art Center (MART) established for assisted reproduction, opened the Modern Mayr Medical Spa in Maryland, Lagos in collaboration with the Viva-Mayr Clinic in Austria.
The spa is a state-of-the-art wellness and detoxification centre with a world-class therapy and beauty clinic.

References

External links
 

Healthcare in Lagos
Spas
Health clubs
Medical and health organizations based in Nigeria
Clubs and societies in Lagos
Clinics